The Flirting Husband is a 1912 American short silent comedy film starring Mabel Normand and Ford Sterling. The film was directed and produced by Mack Sennett.

Cast
 Mabel Normand as Mrs. Smith
 Ford Sterling as Mr. Smith
 Fred Mace
 Mack Sennett

External links
 

1912 films
1912 comedy films
Silent American comedy films
American silent short films
American black-and-white films
Films directed by Mack Sennett
Keystone Studios films
1912 short films
American comedy short films
1910s American films